was a Japanese actor. He appeared in more than 300 films between 1930 and 1971. Sugai often worked with Kaneto Shindo, Kenji Mizoguchi and Kōzaburō Yoshimura.

Selected filmography

 The Water Magician (1933)
 Spring on Leper's Island (1940)
 Sanshiro Sugata (1943)
 The Most Beautiful (1944)
 Sanshiro Sugata Part II (1945)
 Minshū no Teki (1946)
 Aru yo no Tonosama (1946)
 Apostasy (1948)
 Stray Dog (1949)
 Waga koi wa moenu (1949)
 Story of a Beloved Wife (1951)
 Early Summer (1951)
 Avalanche (1952)
 The Life of Oharu (1952)
 Epitome (1953)
 Life of a Woman (1953)
 Sansho the Bailiff (1954)
 The Crucified Lovers (1954)
 Wolf (1955)
 Shirogane Shinjū (1956)
 Ruri no kishi (1956)
 Night Drum (1958)
 Odd Obsession (1959)
 Kenju burai-chō Nukiuchino Ryu (1960)
 The Pornographers (1966)
 Gamera vs. Barugon (1966)
 The Yoshiwara Story (1968)
 Daimon Otokode Shinitai (1969)
 Chōkōsō no Akebono (1969)
 Heat Wave Island (1969)
 Yakuza's Law: Yakuza Keibatsushi: Rinchi (1969)

References

External links

1907 births
1973 deaths
Japanese male film actors
People from Kyoto
20th-century Japanese male actors